Ulnar collateral ligament reconstruction, colloquially known as Tommy John surgery (TJS), is a surgical graft procedure where the ulnar collateral ligament in the medial elbow is replaced with either a tendon from elsewhere in the patient's body, or with one from a deceased donor. The procedure is common among collegiate and professional athletes in several sports, particularly in baseball.

The procedure was devised in 1974 by orthopedic surgeon Frank Jobe, a Los Angeles Dodgers team physician who served as a special advisor to the team until his death in 2014. It is named after the first baseball player to undergo the surgery, major league pitcher Tommy John, whose record of 288 career victories ranks seventh among left-handed pitchers. The initial operation, John's successful post-surgery career, and the relationship between the two men was the subject of a 2013 ESPN 30 for 30 documentary.

Uses 

The ulnar collateral ligament (UCL) can become stretched, frayed, or torn through the repetitive stress of the throwing motion. The risk of injury to the UCL is believed to be extremely high, as the amount of stress through the structure approaches its ultimate tensile strength during a hard throw.

This injury is associated with baseball, although it sometimes appears in other sports. Compared to athletes who play other sports, baseball players are at elevated risk of overuse injuries and injuries caused by early sports specialization among children and teenagers.

While some sources say that an individual's style of throwing or the type of pitches that they throw is the most important determinant of their likelihood to sustain an injury, the results of a 2002 study suggest that the total number of pitches thrown is the greatest determinant. A 2002 study examined the throwing volume, pitch type and throwing mechanics of 426 pitchers aged nine to fourteen for one year. Compared to pitchers who threw 200 or fewer pitches in a season, those who threw 201–400, 401–600, 601–800, and 800+ pitches faced an increased risk of 63%, 181%, 234%, and 161% respectively. The types of pitches thrown showed a smaller effect; throwing a slider was associated with an 86% increased chance of elbow injury while throwing a curveball was associated with an increase in pain. There was only a weak correlation between throwing mechanics perceived as bad and injury-prone.

However, because there are many effective styles of pitching, incorrect throwing mechanics can be difficult to define and determine. One of the most common denominators among virtually all pitchers is "reaching back" with the throwing arm before release and follow-through. This repeated motion is believed to be a major contributing factor in UCL injuries, as it stretches the ligament in an unnatural manner and direction. Simply raising the pitching arm and bringing it forward with a complete follow-through produces the same levels of spin rate, velocity, movement, and location while helping to protect the UCL from unnecessary injury.

Research into throwing injuries in young athletes has led to age-based recommendations for pitch limits. A 2016 study explained 22% of the variation in those needing ulnar collateral ligament reconstruction, identifying handedness, standard deviation of release point, days lost to arm and shoulder injuries, previous ulnar collateral ligament reconstruction, number of hard pitches, ERA- and age as the known risk factors.

In younger athletes whose epiphyseal plate (growth plate) is still open, the force on the inside of the elbow during throwing is more likely to cause the elbow to fail at this point than at the ulnar collateral ligament. This injury is often termed "Little League elbow" and can be serious but does not require reconstructing the UCL.

Increasingly often, pitchers require a second procedure after returning to pitching. During the periods from 2001 to 2012 and 2013 to 2015, 18 major-league pitchers underwent the procedure for a second time. As of April 2015, the average amount of time between procedures is 4.97 years.

Risks 
There is a risk of damage to the ulnar nerve.

Misconceptions  

Some baseball pitchers believe that they can throw harder after ulnar collateral ligament reconstruction than they did beforehand. As a result, orthopedic surgeons have reported that parents of young pitchers have asked them to perform the procedure on their uninjured sons in the hope that it will increase performance. However, many people, including Frank Jobe, believe that any postsurgical increases in performance are most likely the result of the increased stability of the elbow joint and pitchers' increased attention to their fitness and conditioning. Jobe believed that rather than allowing pitchers to gain speed, the surgery and rehab protocols merely allow pitchers to return to their pre-injury levels of performance.

Technique

Reconstruction 

Holes to accommodate a replacement graft tendon are drilled in the ulna and humerus bones of the elbow. A harvested tendon, such as the palmaris tendon from the forearm of the same or opposite elbow, the patellar tendon, hamstring, toe extensor or a donor's tendon (allograft), is then woven in a figure-eight pattern through the holes and anchored. The ulnar nerve is usually moved to prevent pain, as scar tissue can apply pressure to the nerve. The procedure is performed on an outpatient basis allowing discharge the same day, with the arm in a splint to protect the repair for the first week. After one week, a brace is employed to protect the reconstruction for about six weeks following surgery.

Repair 

Repair is largely viable in cases of acute UCL avulsion type-injury at the proximal or distal end, with the main benefit of the procedure is reduced rehabilitation time compared to that of UCL reconstruction. Early attempts at UCL repair yielded poor results and were largely abandoned until anchor fixation was improved in 2008.

Recovery 

The rehabilitation process following surgery is typically divided into four separate phases.

 Rehabilitation phase 1 (postoperative weeks zero to three) consists of prevention of stiffness, promotion of healing, and simultaneous protection of the reconstructed graft with a hinged elbow brace
 The goals of phase 2 (weeks four to eight) are to gain strength and gain full range of movement
 During phase 3 (weeks nine to 13), the rehabilitation is focused on flexibility and neuromuscular control with a progression toward sports-related activities
 The progression to a throwing program is made during phase 4 (weeks 14 to 26) for overhead athletes

Full competition throwing is usually permitted at seven to nine months, and pitchers are ready to return to the game at approximately 10 to 18 months.

Incidence 

Over the past two decades, the number of UCLR surgeries has increased threefold, a rate that is expected to rise in upcoming years. A study has shown that the rate of UCLR surgery for those aged 15 to 19 is the highest among all age ranges and is increasing by 9% each year.

USA Baseball, Major League Baseball, and Little League Baseball have initiated the Pitch Smart program designed to lower the risk of elbow injuries in adolescent pitchers. The main risk factors for elbow injury from overhand throwing include the number of pitches per game, innings pitched per season, months pitched per year and poor pitching biomechanics that may increase torque and force on the elbow.

History  

At the time of John's operation, Jobe estimated the chance for success of the operation at one in 100. By 2009, the odds of complete recovery had risen to 85–92%.

Following his 1974 surgery, John missed the entire 1975 season rehabilitating his arm before returning for the 1976 season. Before his surgery, John had won 124 games. He won 164 games after surgery, retiring in 1989 at age 46.

For baseball players, full rehabilitation takes about 1215 months for pitchers and about six months for position players. Players typically begin throwing about 16 weeks after surgery. While 80% of players return to pitching at the same level as before the surgery, for those Major League Baseball pitchers who receive the surgery twice, 35% never pitch again in the major leagues.

Jobe has stated that if he had invented the technique ten years earlier, it might have been nicknamed Sandy Koufax surgery, after Dodgers hall of famer Sandy Koufax, who retired with "essentially the same thing as Tommy John."

References 

Orthopedic surgical procedures
Sports medicine
1974 introductions
American inventions